Balutban (also Romanized as Balūţbān; also known as Morād ʿAlī) is a village in Kashkan Rural District, Shahivand District, Dowreh County, Lorestan Province, Iran. At the 2006 census, its population was 125, in 27 families.

References 

Towns and villages in Dowreh County